Ed Connolly may refer to:
Ed Connolly (catcher) (1908–1963), catcher in Major League Baseball, 1929–1932
Ed Connolly (pitcher) (1939–1998), his son, pitcher in Major League Baseball, 1964–1967

See also
Edward Conolly (disambiguation)
Edward Connelly (1859–1928), American film actor
Edward J. Connelly (1876–1960), American military officer
Edward M. Connelly (1892–1947), federal prosecutor
Edward G. Connolly (1928–2006), American politician in Massachusetts